Arent can refer to

Arent (given name)
Arent (surname)
Arent Fox, American law firm and lobbying group